Come to Me Great Mystery: Native American Healing Songs is a compilation album of Native American music released by Silver Wave Records on April 22, 2008. In 2009, the album won Tom Wasinger the Grammy Award for Best Native American Music Album.

Track listing
 "Come to Me Great Mystery", performed by Thirza Defoe – 7:21
 "Hear My Prayer", performed by Doug Foote (aka Doug Good Feather) – 5:58
 "Hue Hue", performed by Lorain Fox – 5:50
 "Beauty Way", performed by Allen Mose – 6:59
 "Calling to the People", performed by Thirza Defoe – 6:53
 "I Am the Beginning and the End", performed by Dorothy Tsatoke – 6:53
 "A Prayer from Above", performed by Doug Foote (aka Doug Good Feather) – 6:58
 "Kaio Kaio", performed by Lorain Fox – 3:54

Personnel
 Douglas Foote (aka Doug Good Feather) – composer
 James Marienthal – executive producer
 Allen Mose – composer
 Valerie Sanford – design
 Susan Wasinger – cover illustration
 Tom Wasinger – arranger, producer, engineer, mixing, photography, instrumentation

References

2008 compilation albums
Grammy Award for Best Native American Music Album